Merothrips floridensis is a species of thrips in the family Merothripidae. It is found in the Caribbean Sea, Central America, North America, South America, and Europe.

References

Further reading

 
 
 
 

Thrips
Articles created by Qbugbot
Insects described in 1927